The 2016 season is IFK Norrköping's 119th in existence, their 76th season in Allsvenskan and 6th consecutive season in the league. The club compete in 2016 Allsvenskan, 2015–16 Svenska Cupen (group stage and onwards), 2016–17 Svenska Cupen (qualifying rounds) and 2016–17 UEFA Champions League (entering in the second qualifying round as winners of 2015 Allsvenskan). IFK drew an average home league attendance of 10,449.

The season began on 20 February 2016 with the 2015–16 Svenska Cupen group stage, and the league began on 2 April 2016 and ended in November 2016.

IFK Norrköping are the defending league champions after they won the 2015 Allsvenskan in the last match of the season. In that last match they defeated the champions from the previous season, Malmö FF, with 2–0 and enjoyed their first league title for 26 years (13 titles in total).

Squad statistics
Source: Soccerway and Competitions.

Appearances and goals

Numbers in parentheses denote appearances as substitute.

Goalscorers

Disciplinary record

Competitions

Overall

Overview
{| class="wikitable" style="text-align: center"
|-
!rowspan=2|Competition
!colspan=8|Record
|-
!
!
!
!
!
!
!
!
|-
| Allsvenskan

|-
| 2015–16 Svenska Cupen

|-
| 2016–17 Svenska Cupen

|-
| UEFA Champions League

|-
! Total

Note: Only matches during 2016 are included, otherwise they would be counted twice (previous season or next season as well).

Allsvenskan

League table

Results summary

Results by matchday

Matches
On 9 December 2015, the fixtures for the forthcoming season were announced. On 19 December 2015, the dates and kickoff times for the first twelve rounds were announced. The dates for matches in round 13 to 20 were announced on 16 May 2016, and on 1 June 2016 the rest of the rounds (21 to 30) were announced, with the exception of the second-to-last round (29th round) which was decided on a later date.

Kickoff times before 24 October 2016 are CEST (UTC+2), otherwise times are CET (UTC+1). This because of the use of Daylight saving time in Sweden.

Notes
The match between IFK Norrköping and BK Häcken from round 19 was played before round 18

Svenska Cupen

Svenska Cupen, unlike Allsvenskan, spans over two seasons, with qualification in the fall and group stage and final stages in the spring.
Therefore, IFK Norrköping will compete in both 2015–16 Svenska Cupen (group stage and final stages) and 2016–17 Svenska Cupen (qualification for next year group stage and final stages) for the 2016 season.

2015–16 Svenska Cupen

2015–16 Svenska Cupen are being played during the fall in 2015 and in the spring of 2016, with the first two rounds in 2015 and the group stage and final stages in the beginning of 2016.

Group stage

IFK Norrköping were placed in group 1, as champions and winners of 2015 Allsvenskan, together with winners of 2015 Superettan (second tier), Jönköpings Södra IF, based on teams positions in the Swedish league system after 2015 season. This since first-ranked team are paired with sixteenth-ranked team in group 1, second-ranked team with fifteenth-ranked team in group 2 and so on to fill all eighth groups. One team from Allsvenskan did not qualify for group stage making winners from Superettan being the sixteenth seeded team. The draw amongst the unseeded teams to decide the last two teams was held on 26 November 2015, and IFK Norrköping and Jönköpings Södra IF were drawn together with Östersunds FK and AFC United. IFK Norrköping won their first two matches against Östersunds FK and AFC United, and could secure a place in the final stages with a draw in the last match against Jönköpings Södra IF.

Kickoff times are in CET (UTC+1) unless stated otherwise.

Knockout stage

IFK Norrköping qualified for the knockout stage as group stage winners, but they were unseeded in the quarter-final draw because they were not one of the four teams with the best record in the group stage. In the quarter-finals they were drawn against seeded Malmö FF who had the advantage of playing at home.

2016–17 Svenska Cupen

2016–17 Svenska Cupen was played during the fall in 2016 and in the spring of 2017, with the first two rounds in 2016 and the group stage and final stages in the beginning of 2017.

Round 2
IFK Norrköping entered Svenska Cupen in the second round (all teams from top tier Allsvenskan and second tier Superettan receive bye to this round). They were seeded in the draw together will all the other teams from Allsvenskan and Superettan, and they were drawn against an unseeded team (from third tier or lower). The winning team qualified for the group stage to be played in the beginning of the following season.

The draw was held on 7 July 2016 with IFK Norrköping being drawn against Västerås SK from Division 1 (3rd tier). The match was played on 24 August in Västerås (since the lower-tier team has home advantage in second round), and Norrköping advanced to the group stage after winning 4–0.

Kickoff times are in CET (UTC+1) unless stated otherwise.

UEFA Champions League

IFK Norrköping qualified for 2016–17 UEFA Champions League by winning 2015 Allsvenskan. They entered in second qualifying round and had to go through both the second and third qualifying round as well as the play-off round to reach the group stage, which is start of main tournament. However, they were eliminated in the second qualifying round against Rosenborg.

Qualifying phase and play-off round

In the qualifying phase and play-off round, each tie was played over two legs, with each team playing one leg at home. The team that scored more goals on aggregate over the two legs advanced to the next round. If the aggregate score was level, the away goals rule was applied, i.e., the team that scored more goals away from home over the two legs advanced. If away goals were also equal, then thirty minutes of extra time was played, divided into two fifteen-minutes halves. The away goals rule was again applied after extra time, i.e., if there were goals scored during extra time and the aggregate score was still level, the visiting team advanced by virtue of more away goals scored. If no goals were scored during extra time, the tie was decided by penalty shoot-out

Kickoff times are in CEST (UTC+2) unless stated otherwise.

Second qualifying round
The draw for the second qualifying round was held on 20 June 2016, and IFK Norrköping was drawn against Norwegian champions Rosenborg.

References

IFK Norrköping seasons
IFK Norrkoping